Bolshiye Prudy is a rural locality (a khutor) in Gmelinskoye Rural Settlement, Staropoltavsky District, Volgograd Oblast, Russia. The population was 30 as of 2010.

Geography 
Bolshiye Prudy is located in a steppe of the Transvolga Region, on the bank of the Bolshoy Pond, 46 km southeast of Staraya Poltavka (the district's administrative centre) by road. Pervomaysky is the nearest rural locality.

References 

Rural localities in Staropoltavsky District